The  is an electric multiple unit (EMU) commuter train type operated by the private railway operator Nankai Electric Railway in Japan in Japan on Southern Premium limited express services between  and  since 1985.

Overview 
As of 2014, the fleet consists of five four-car sets (10004, 10007 to 10010).

Formations 
The four-car sets are formed as follows, with two motored ("M") cars and two non-powered intermediate trailer ("T") cars.

Interior 
Passenger accommodation consists of transverse seating.

History 
The 10000 series was originally delivered between 1985 and 1987 in 10 two-car formations. In 1992, the series was reformatted into seven four-car trainsets. This was done by manufacturing eight trailing cars for four sets and rebuilding the ends of three two-car sets to form the other three four-car sets.

In January 2011, it was announced that the 10000 series trainsets will undergo replacement by incoming 12000 series sets.

The first set to be scrapped was 10006 on 25 December 2012. Set 10005 followed suit and underwent scrapping on 7 May 2013. The front end of car 10905 is preserved at the Wakuwaku Train Land railway theme park.

References 

Electric multiple units of Japan
Train-related introductions in 1985
Nankai Electric Railway rolling stock
1500 V DC multiple units of Japan
Tokyu Car multiple units